Suez Canal Authority (SCA) is an Egyptian state-owned authority which owns, operates and maintains the Suez Canal. It was set up by the Egyptian government to replace the Suez Canal Company in the 1950s which resulted in the Suez Crisis. After the UN intervened, the three invading countries (France, Israel, and the United Kingdom) were forced to withdraw.

Establishment and organization
SCA is an independent authority having legal personality. SCA was established by the nationalization act signed on 26 July 1956 by the Egyptian president Gamal Abdel Nasser. The act at the same time nationalized the Suez Canal Company and transferred all its assets and employees to the SCA established by this act.

The head office is located in Ismaïlia. In Port Said the administration building of the earlier Suez Canal Company is used. Its board of directors comprises 14 persons, including the chairman and managing director.

Assets, duties and responsibilities
SCA owns the Suez Canal and all areas, buildings and equipment pertaining thereto. SCA issues the Rules of Navigation, specifies the tolls for the use of the canal and collects them. The tolls are expressed in XDR and collected in USD, GBP, EUR and other currencies. In 2008, the total revenue in tolls was 5,381.9 million USD for the passage of a total of 21,415 vessels - resulting in an average toll of 251,314.5 USD per vessel.

SCA is responsible for the operation and maintenance of the Suez Canal, for the safety of the traffic and for all other matters relating thereto. According to the nationalisation act, SCA is bound by the 1888 Convention of Constantinople, which grants the right of free access and use of the canal at equal conditions to all ships, commercial ships and ships of war, in times of peace or of war, even to ships of belligerent parties.

SCA is responsible for the computerized traffic management supported by radar, for the 14 pilot stations and their pilots. Since 1996, SCA operates the Maritime Training and Simulation Center for its pilots. SCA operates some 60 ships and boats, such as tugs, dredgers, cranes, and smaller boats.

According to SCA's web site, its facilities also include 114 ferry connections with 36 ferry boats; the Ahmed Hamdi road tunnel; the Nile Shipyard; the roads alongside the canal; a silk production in a farm at Serabium using treated sanitary waste water for irrigation; water plants in the canal cities; 12,000 housing units; a hospital in Ismailia and emergency hospitals at both ends of the canal; 4 schools and various sports and recreational centers.

Revenues 
In 2020, the total revenue generated amounted to 5.61 billion USD and 18,829 ships with a total net tonnage of 1.17 billion passed through the canal. Daily revenues are $15 million USD or €13 million.

On 2 January 2022, SCA announced revenues of 6.3 billion USD for 2021 - the highest in the canal's history. This represented an increase of 12.8% over 2020. In total, 20,649 vessels flowed through the Suez Canal in 2021 - an increase of 10% over 2020.

In 2022, annual revenue stood at $8 billion in transit fees.

Chairmen of the Suez Canal Authority
Since nationalisation (1956–present):
Helmy Bahgat Badawi (26 July 1956 – 9 July 1957)
Mahmoud Younis (10 July 1957 – 10 October 1965)
Mashhour Ahmed Mashhour (14 October 1965 – 31 December 1983)
Mohamed Ezzat Adel (1 January 1984 – December 1995)
Ahmed Ali Fadel (22 January 1996 – August 2012)
Mohab Mamish (August 2012 – August 2019)
Osama Mounir Rabie (August 2019 – present)

See also
 Panama Canal Authority

References

External links
Suez Canal Authority official website
Port Said Port Authority
Egyptian Maritime Data Bank, a service of the Egyptian government

Authority, Suez Canal Authority
Government-owned companies of Egypt